Ekroop Bedi is an Indian television actress, who has appeared in Hindi 
television series, like  Suhani Si Ek Ladki, Dharampatni, Rab Se Sohna Isshq, and Bani – Ishq Da Kalma.  She was seen in Star Plus's Koi Laut Ke Aaya Hai.
Sony tv's "Peshwa Bajirao" and is currently seen on Color TV’s Shakti - Astitva Ke Ehsaas Ki.

Personal life
On 12 December 2018, Bedi became engaged to and on 17 December 2018, married Harmeet Jolly.

Television

References

External links

Living people
Indian television actresses
Actresses from Mumbai
Actresses in Hindi television
1996 births